Hans Sterr (8 June 1933 – 18 May 2011) was a German wrestler. He competed in the men's Greco-Roman middleweight at the 1956 Summer Olympics.

References

1933 births
2011 deaths
German male sport wrestlers
Olympic wrestlers of the United Team of Germany
Wrestlers at the 1956 Summer Olympics
Sportspeople from Munich